George Samuel Mayers (1860–1952) was an Irish Anglican priest.

He was educated at Trinity College, Dublin, ordained 1885 and began his ecclesiastical career with a curacy at Clonagam, Co. Waterford, and Holy Trinity Church, Waterford. He held incumbencies at Tubrid, Killaloan and Dungarvan. He was Canon and Treasurer of Waterford Cathedral from 1901. Dean of Lismore from 1913 until 1919 and Dean of Waterford from 1919.

References

Alumni of Trinity College Dublin
Deans of Lismore
Deans of Waterford
1860 births
1952 deaths